Argentines in Spain are the largest community of Argentines abroad. In Spain, they form one of the largest immigrant groups in the country.

Argentina is considered a country of immigrants, especially during the 20th century, but as a result of political, social and economic problems that hit the country in recent decades, many Argentines chose to emigrate, mainly to other countries in the Americas or countries where their parents and/or grandparents came from (mainly Spain, Germany, and Italy).

In 2018, 256,071 Argentines lived in Spain. 18,390 lived in Catalonia, with 13,387 in Barcelona. 12,635 lived in Andalucia, with 6,589 in Málaga. 10,526 lived in Valencia, with 5,510 in Alicante. 9,706 lived in Madrid, and 6,746 lived in the Balearic Islands.

History

Background 
The ancestral origins of the Argentine nation show recent ancestors of generations predominantly as Spanish and Italian, but with strong French, Russian, German, Native American, African, Slavic and Semitic components. However, they faced very different legal circumstances that Spain and Italy had long before they joined the European Union migration policy, thousands of people a day come to the consulates of Spain to process the new nationality or obtain a visa.
The Argentines are the fourth most numerous Latin American community in Spain, having recently been surpassed by Venezuelans.

Notable people

See also 

 Argentina–Spain relations
 Immigration to Spain
 Spanish Argentine
 Italians in Spain

References 

 
Spain